The Lord-Lieutenant of Greater London is the personal representative of the monarch, currently King Charles III, in Greater London.

Each Lord-Lieutenant is assisted in, largely ceremonial, duties by Deputy Lieutenants whom he appoints; the Lieutenancy Office is based at Whitehall, London SW1.

The Lord-Lieutenant is also assisted by a Lord-Lieutenant's Cadet, one from each branch of the main cadet forces, Army Cadet Force, Air Training Corps and Sea Cadet Corps. The cadet is selected by the Lord-Lieutenant. The Lord-Lieutenant's Cadet's are from the county of the Lord-Lieutenant.

Created under the Administration of Justice Act (1964), this office merged those of Lord-Lieutenant of the County of London (cr. 1889) and the ancient Lord-Lieutenancy of Middlesex. The ceremonial county of Greater London does not include the City of London, which has its own Commission of Lieutenancy.

List of Lord-Lieutenants of Greater London
From 1965, the following have served as HM Lord-Lieutenant of Greater London :

 1 Apr 1965 – 1966 : Harold, Earl Alexander of Tunis;
28 Dec 1966 – 1973 : Sir Gerald Templer;
12 Sep 1973 – 1978 : Charles, Baron Elworthy;
 1 Jul 1978 – 1986 : Norah, Baroness Phillips; 
31 Jan 1986 – 1998 : Edwin, Baron Bramall ;
21 Dec 1998 – 2008 : Peter, Baron Imbert ;
27 Apr 2008 – 2015 : Sir David Brewer;
29 May 2015 – present : Sir Kenneth Olisa.

See also 

 Custos rotulorum
 Lord-Lieutenant

Notes

External links

Burke's Peerage & Baronetage.

Greater London
1965 establishments in England
Local government in London
Political office-holders in London
London, Greater